Andrew Thompson (1884 – 15 January 1961) was an Australian politician. He was the Labor member for Wide Bay in the Legislative Assembly of Queensland from 1918 to 1920.

Thompson died in 1961 and was buried in Nambour Garden Lawn Cemetery.

References

1884 births
1961 deaths
Members of the Queensland Legislative Assembly
Place of birth missing
Australian Labor Party members of the Parliament of Queensland
20th-century Australian politicians